Nancheng Subdistrict is a subdistrict of Guangdong Province, China. It is under the administration of Dongguan city.

Geography
Nancheng is a town located in the new city central area of Dongguan, and also where the Municipal Committee of Communist Party of China and the Municipal Government of Dongguan situate at. The district occupies an area of 59 square meters with 17 Community Resident Committees under its jurisdiction. Total resident population of 62,000 and new Dongguanese of 153,000 reside in the district. It is the new political and cultural centre of Dongguan, after the government moved here from the old city centre at Guancheng District.

Infrastructure and public facilities
The prime location of Nancheng leads easy access to all parts of the city and economic zones in China, Hong Kong and Macau with all the highways, railway, canal and other connecting infrastructures.  Many buildings and public facilities like International Conventional Centre, Congress building, Yulan Theatre, Heritage Museum, Science and Technology Museum, public library and Children & Youth Centre, all stood as symbols of Dongguan, are located in Nancheng.

Transportation
There is a bus service from Nancheng Subdistrict to Shenzhen Bao'an International Airport in Shenzhen.

Education

International School of Dongguan is located in Nancheng District.

Economics
GDP of Nancheng in 2008 reached RMB18,300,000,000, represented an increase of 16.4% from last year. Nancheng recorded a total tax revenue of RMB3,100,000,000 with an increase of 15.2% yoy. The balance of deposit was RMB41,900,000,000 with an increase of 11.5% yoy. Retail sales of consumer goods in the district reached RMB5,040,000,000 with an increase of 29% yoy.

Many large international enterprises have set up hubs in Nancheng, such as Walmart, Nokia, Nestle, etc., and from the list 12 of them are the world’s largest 500 enterprises. There are also 13 national high and new technological enterprises such as Dongguan Anwell Digital Machinery Co., Ltd., Dongguan Land Dragon Paper Industries Co., Ltd., and Dongguan Shengyi Copper Clad laminate Co., Ltd. etc., one provincial level innovative pilot enterprise and 26 provincial high and new technological enterprises situated in Nancheng that could further promote Nancheng as a key region that has the most operation hubs of worldwide enterprises.

References

Township-level divisions of Guangdong
Geography of Dongguan
Subdistricts of the People's Republic of China